Aldo Jafid Cruz Sánchez (born 24 September 1997) is a Mexican professional footballer who plays as a left-back for Liga MX club Atlético San Luis, on loan from Tijuana.

Club career
On 11 June 2019 it was confirmed, that Cruz would join Tijuana for the upcoming season.

International career
Cruz was called up by Jaime Lozano to participate with the under-22 team at the 2019 Pan American Games, with Mexico winning the third-place match.

Career statistics

Club

Honours
Mexico U23
Pan American Bronze Medal: 2019

References

External links
 Aldo Cruz at Debut Club América
 
 
 Aldo Jafid Cruz Sánchez at the 2019 Pan American Games

1997 births
Living people
Footballers from Michoacán
Mexican footballers
Sportspeople from Morelia
Club América footballers
Lobos BUAP footballers
Club Tijuana footballers
Liga MX players
Association football defenders
Pan American Games medalists in football
Pan American Games bronze medalists for Mexico
Footballers at the 2019 Pan American Games
Medalists at the 2019 Pan American Games